Saint-Étienne is a city and the prefecture of the Loire department in eastern-central France, in the Massif Central,  southwest of Lyon in the Auvergne-Rhône-Alpes region.

Saint-Étienne is the thirteenth most populated commune in France and the second most populated commune in Auvergne-Rhône-Alpes. Its metropolis (métropole), Saint-Étienne Métropole, is the third most populous regional metropolis after Grenoble-Alpes and Lyon. The commune is also at the heart of a vast metropolitan area with 497,034 inhabitants (2018), the eighteenth largest in France by population, comprising 105 communes. Its inhabitants are known as Stéphanois (masculine) and Stéphanoises (feminine).

Long known as the French city of the "weapon, cycle and ribbon" and a major coal mining centre, Saint-Étienne is currently engaged in a vast urban renewal program aimed at leading the transition from the industrial city inherited from the 19th century to the "design capital" of the 21st century. This approach was recognised with the entry of Saint-Étienne into the UNESCO Creative Cities network in 2010. The city is currently undergoing renewal, with the installation of the Châteaucreux business district, the steel shopping centre and the manufacturing creative district.

The city is known for its football club AS Saint-Étienne which has won the Ligue 1 title a record ten times.

History

In the 13th century, it was a small borough around the church dedicated to Saint Stephen. On the upper reaches of the Furan, near the Way of St. James, the Abbey of Valbenoîte had been founded by the Cistercians in 1222. In the late 15th century, it was a fortified village defended by walls built around the original nucleus.

From the 16th century, Saint-Étienne developed an arms manufacturing industry and became a market town. It was this which accounted for the town's importance, although it also became a centre for the manufacture of ribbons and passementerie starting in the 17th century.

Later, it became a mining centre of the Loire coal mining basin, and more recently, has become known for its bicycle industry.

The concentration of industry prompted these numbers to rise rapidly to 110,000 by about 1880. Saint-Étienne absorbed the commune of Valbenoîte and several other neighbouring localities on 31 March 1855.

Demographics
The population data in the table and graph below refer to the commune of Saint-Étienne proper, in its geography at the given years. The commune of Saint-Étienne absorbed the former communes of Beaubrun, Montaud, Outre-Furent and Valbenoîte in 1855, ceded Planfoy in 1863, merged with the exclave Saint-Victor-sur-Loire and with Terrenoire in 1969 and Rochetaillée in 1973.

Culture

Saint-Étienne became a popular stop for automobile travelers in the early 20th century.

In 1998, Saint-Étienne set up a design biennale, the largest of its kind in France. It lasts around two weeks. A landmark in the history of the importance ascribed to design in Saint-Étienne was the inauguration of La Cité du design on the site of the former arms factory in 2009.

The city also launched the Massenet Festivals, (the composer Jules Massenet hailed from the area) devoted mainly to perform Massenet's operas. In 2000, the city was named one of the French Towns and Lands of Art and History. On 22 November 2010, it was nominated as "City of Design" as part of UNESCO's Creative Cities Network.

Saint-Étienne has four museums:

 the Musée d'Art Moderne has one of the largest collections of modern and contemporary art in France
 Musée de la Mine
 Musée d'Art et d'Industrie (fr)
 Musée du vieux Saint-Étienne (fr)

Climate
The climate is temperate at the weather station due to its low altitude, but Saint-Étienne itself is much higher, above 530 m (1,739 ft) in the centre, as well as even above 700 m (2,297 ft) in the southern parts of the city. Saint-Étienne is very close from a warm-summer humid continental climate (Köppen: Dfb); it is generally one of the snowiest cities in France, with an average of 85 cm (2.79 ft) of snow accumulation per year.

Sport

The city's football club AS Saint-Étienne has won the Ligue 1 title a record ten times, achieving most of their success in the 1970s. The British indie-dance band Saint Etienne named themselves after the club.

Saint-Étienne has many sports stadiums, the largest being Stade Geoffroy-Guichard used for football and Stade Henri-Lux for athletics. St. Étienne was the capital of the French bicycle industry. The bicycle wheel manufacturer Mavic is based in the city and frame manufacturers Motobécane and Vitus are also based here. The city often hosts a stage of the Tour de France.

Saint-Étienne resident Thierry Gueorgiou is a world champion in orienteering. The local rugby union team is CA Saint-Étienne Loire Sud Rugby.

Transport

The main railway station is Saint-Étienne-Châteaucreux station, which offers high-speed services to Paris and Lyon (Saint-Étienne–Lyon railway), as well as connects to several regional lines. There are four other railway stations in Saint-Étienne (Bellevue, Carnot, La Terrasse and Le Clapier) with local services.

Saint-Étienne is also notable for its tramway (Saint-Étienne tramway) – which uniquely with Lille, it kept throughout the 20th century – and its trolleybus system (Saint-Étienne trolleybus system) – which is one of only three such systems currently operating in France.

Bus and tram transport is regulated and provided by the Société de Transports de l'Agglomération Stéphanoise (STAS), a public transport executive organisation.

The bicycle sharing system Vélivert with 280 short term renting bicycles has been available since June 2010.

Colleges and universities
 Jean Monnet University
 École d'Économie - Saint-Étienne School of Economics (SE²)
 École Nationale Supérieure des Mines de Saint-Étienne (EMSE or ENSMSE)
 École nationale d'ingénieurs de Saint-Étienne (ENISE)
 Telecom Saint Etienne (TSE)
 EMLYON Business School 
ENSASE (Ecole National Supérieure d'Architecture de Saint-Étienne)

Notable people

Saint-Étienne was the birthplace of:
René Diaz, French journalist and illustrator
 Augustin Dupré (1748–1833), engraver of French coins and medals, France's 14th graveur général des monnaies
 Claude Fauriel (1772–1844), historian, philologist and critic
 Saint Marcellin Champagnat (1789–1840), Catholic priest and founding members of the Society of Mary (Marist Fathers) who founded the Marist Brothers and was canonised in 1999
 Antonin Moine (1796–1849), sculptor
 Jules Janin (1804–1874), writer and critic
 Francis Garnier (1839–1873), officer and explorer who explored the Mekong River, much to the surprise of the inhabitants
 Lucie Grange (1839-1908), medium, feminist prophet, newspaper founder
 Jules Massenet (1842–1912), composer best known for his operas
 Paul de Vivie, aka Velocio (1853–1930), publisher of Le Cycliste, early champion of the dérailleur and father of French cycle touring
 Claudine Chomat (1915–1995), member of the French Resistance during World War II, feminist, communist activist
 Jean Bonfils (1921–2007), classical organist and composer
 André Bourgey (1936), geographer
 Jean-Michel Othoniel (1963), contemporary artist
 Bernard Lavilliers (b. 1946), (Bernard Ouillon), singer
 Orlan (1947–), contemporary artist
 Willy Sagnol (b. 1977), French International football player
 Jean Guitton (1901–1999), Catholic philosopher and theologian
 Thierry Gueorgiou (b. 1979), Orienteering world champion
 Norma Ray (born 1970), singer
 Alexis Ajinça (born 1988), basketball player
 Sylvain Armand (born 1980), footballer
 Sliimy (born 1988), singer
 Aravane Rezai (born 1987), tennis player
 Loïc Perrin (born 1985), footballer

It was also the place where Andrei Kivilev died.

International relations

Saint-Étienne is twinned with:

See also

 Manufacture d'armes de Saint-Étienne
 Saint-Étienne Cathedral
 Saint-Étienne – Gorges de la Loire Nature Reserve
 André César Vermare, sculptor of Franco-Prussian war memorial

References

Bibliography

External links

 
 City council website
 Tourist board official website

 
Massif Central
Communes of Loire (department)
Prefectures in France
Forez
Loire communes articles needing translation from French Wikipedia
Cities in France